Merthyr Tydfil Electric Tramways operated a tramway service in Merthyr Tydfil between 1901 and 1939.

History

The company was owned by the Merthyr Tydfil Electric Traction and Lighting Company, a subsidiary company of British Electric Traction. Services started on 6 April 1901. Sixteen tramcars were purchased from the Midland Railway Carriage and Wagon Company and Electric Railway and Tramway Carriage Works for the initial services.

Closure

The company was purchased by the local authority in 1939 for the sum of £13,500 with the aim of closing down the service, and the final tram ran on 23 August 1939.

References

Tram transport in Wales
3 ft 6 in gauge railways in Wales